Neoregelia pascoaliana is a species of flowering plant in the genus Neoregelia. This is a species that is endemic to Brazil.

Cultivars 
 Neoregelia 'Etch-a-Sketch'

References 
BSI Cultivar Registry Retrieved 11 October 2009

Flora of Brazil
pascoaliana